Omek tannou, Ommk tangou or Amuk taniqu is an ancient Tunisian rainmaking ritual  which was inherited from  Punic and Berber traditions involving invocations of the goddess Tanit. It is now all but extinct.

It features the ritual use of the sculpted head of a woman (somewhat resembling the head of a girl's doll), which is carried in procession between the houses of a village during periods of drought by children singing the refrain  (Tunisian latin script: Ommk tangou ya nsee, talbt rabbi ëla s'sctee) - (IPA [omː(ə)k tɜngu jæ nsɛː tälb(ə) rabːi ʕla ʃːteː], "Oh women, Ommk tangou has asked God for rain". This song varies according to the region because the term shta designates rain only in certain urban areas. Each housewife then pours a little water on the statuette, invoking rain.

In some villages, instead of the sculpted head, a stick is used. Each woman attaches a piece of clothing to this before giving some barley to the children in the procession, who then move off, while singing the refrain  (transliteration: ya bu gṭmbu ʾaʿtina shʿir ymla gdḥkm malghdir, "O Bouktambou [deformation of Omouk tangou] give us barley, your container will be filled from the water sources").

 See also CaloianDodola''
German (mythological being)

References 

Religion in Tunisia
Tunisian cultural history